The James Ballantine House is located in Bloomington, Wisconsin.

History
After losing a leg earlier in life, James Ballantine would go on to become involved in money lending, along with growing plants and livestock. The house was listed on the National Register of Historic Places in 1976 and on the State Register of Historic Places in 1989.

References

Houses on the National Register of Historic Places in Wisconsin
National Register of Historic Places in Grant County, Wisconsin
Houses in Grant County, Wisconsin
Italianate architecture in Wisconsin
Brick buildings and structures
Houses completed in 1877
1877 establishments in Wisconsin